Harry Reid International Airport  is an international airport in Paradise, Nevada, and is the main government airport for public use in the Las Vegas Valley, a metropolitan area in the U.S. state of Nevada, about  south of Downtown Las Vegas. The airport is owned by the Clark County Commission and operated by the Clark County Department of Aviation.

The airport was built in 1942, and opened to airline flights in 1948. It has expanded and employed various innovative technologies, such as common-use facilities. The airport has four runways and two passenger terminals. East of the passenger terminals is the Marnell Air Cargo Center; on the airport's west side are fixed-base operators and helicopter companies. The airport services as a base for Allegiant Air, Frontier Airlines, Southwest Airlines, and Spirit Airlines. 

The airport is named after U.S. Senator Harry Reid, who represented Nevada in the Senate from 1987 to 2017. Between 1968 and 2021, the airport was called McCarran International Airport; before 1968, it was named McCarran Field after U.S. Senator Pat McCarran, who represented Nevada from 1933 to 1954.

History

Origins (1920–1948)

The first airport at Las Vegas was Anderson Field, opened in November 1920 southeast of present-day Sahara Ave and Paradise Rd. Purchased by the Rockwell brothers in 1925, the airfield was renamed Rockwell Field, and in April 1926 Western Air Express (WAE) began carrying mail (and eventually passengers). When the brothers sold Rockwell Field and the new owner canceled WAE's lease, the airline had to look for another airport. Local businessman P. A. Simon had built an airfield northeast of the city (now Nellis Air Force Base) and WAE moved there in November 1929 and bought the field a few years later.

When the city tried to buy the field and build a more modern terminal, WAE refused, but with the advent of World War II WAE was pressured to sell. Nevada Senator Pat McCarran helped obtain federal funding for the city to buy the field and build a terminal. He also helped establish a gunnery school by the United States Army Air Corps at the field. For the senator's contributions, the airport was named McCarran Field in 1941.

A third airfield, Alamo Field, was established in 1942 by aviator George Crockett south of Las Vegas, at the present location of Harry Reid International Airport. The Army sought to open a base at the site of McCarran Field, so Clark County purchased Alamo Field to make it its airline airport. Alamo Field became the new McCarran Field on December 19, 1948. Meanwhile, the Army reopened its base at the original McCarran Field in 1949 and named it Nellis Air Force Base in 1950.

Early expansion (1949–1996)
In its first year of operation McCarran Field served over 36,000 passengers. The April 1949 OAG shows 12 departures a day: 5 Western, 5 TWA and 2 United. The Las Vegas casino industry grew during the 1950s, and the airport handled 959,603 passengers in 1959. The May 1959 OAG shows 47 weekday departures: 13 Western, 11 United, 11 TWA, 9 Bonanza and 3 Pacific. The first jet flights were United 720s in September 1960.

Airport officials began planning a new passenger terminal; the original terminal was on Las Vegas Boulevard, and the new one was built on Paradise Road. The terminal, whose design was inspired by the TWA Flight Center in New York City, opened on March 15, 1963. The airport was renamed McCarran International Airport on September 5, 1968. Further expansion took place between 1970 and 1974 with the construction of the A and B gates.

Before deregulation the airport had four dominant carriers: United and TWA served both coasts nonstop, while Western and Hughes Airwest flew to cities in the western US. After the airline industry was deregulated in 1978, the number of airlines at McCarran doubled from seven to fourteen by the end of 1979. New airlines included American, Braniff and Continental.

In response, the county launched an expansion plan, McCarran 2000, listing projects to be undertaken into the year 2000. Expanded baggage claim facilities, an esplanade, and a parking garage opened in 1985; the C Gates and the first line of the people mover system followed in 1987.

The Charter/International Terminal, later renamed Terminal 2, opened in December 1991 to handle international traffic. An additional, nine-story parking garage and a tunnel linking the Las Vegas Beltway to the airport were constructed as well. In June 1998, the southwest and southeast wings of the D Gates were opened.

In the late 1990s the airport focused on attracting foreign airlines. Condor launched service to Cologne/Bonn, the first scheduled transatlantic flight, in November 1996. A Boeing 767 plied the route. In June 1998, Northwest Airlines introduced flights to Tokyo–Narita on Boeing 747s, linking Las Vegas to Asia for the first time.

Innovation and D Gates completion (1997–2011)

In 1997, the airport introduced Common Use Terminal Equipment (CUTE), becoming the first airport in the country to do so. With multiple airlines serving McCarran, it became inefficient to have separate facilities for each airline. CUTE allows for shared use of ticket counters and gates; an airline can overflow to inactive facilities during peak times.

McCarran furthered its common use strategy in 2003 with the SpeedCheck system, introducing Common-Use Self-Service (CUSS) kiosks. The kiosks allow passengers to check-in and print boarding passes for any one of multiple airlines. Previously, airlines had been installing their own check-in kiosks, defeating the use of CUTE and increasing congestion at the ticket counters. SpeedCheck kiosks have been installed at the Las Vegas Convention Center as well.

In January 2005, McCarrran began offering complimentary Wi-Fi throughout its passenger terminals. The service initially covered , making it the largest free Wi-Fi zone among U.S. airports at the time. The northeast wing of the D Gates opened in April 2005, along with a  air traffic control tower at the center of the concourse. The expansion had been postponed following the September 11 attacks but resumed amid high growth in passenger traffic. Later in the year, the airport started a baggage-tracking system using radio-frequency identification (RFID) tags. Small RFID transmitters are inserted into baggage tags to improve bag identification, thereby lowering the risk for lost or misplaced luggage. McCarran became one of the first airports worldwide to conduct RFID tagging on a large scale.

On August 19, 2008 US Airways closed its night-flight hub at McCarran Airport, which had been established by predecessor America West Airlines in the 1990s. In order to maximize the use of its fleet, US Airways had been operating two banks of flights to and from McCarran in the middle of the night. The operation had made US Airways the second-busiest carrier at McCarran, providing over 100 daily round-trip flights. However, amid rising oil prices and continued demand for low fares, the airline decided to close the hub. In 2011, US Airways reduced flights to Las Vegas by an additional 40%.

In September 2008 the northwest wing of the D Gates was completed. This marked the completion of the concourse, which has a total of 44 gates.

In May 2011 construction began on a new air traffic control tower. In January 2014 it was discovered that a chemical coating to prevent the growth of a toxic fungus was added improperly. The problem was corrected by the following June, and the tower opened on August 28, 2016. The shorter tower will be closed and demolished.

In the late 1990s, the county decided to build a second airport for Las Vegas, to be located 30 miles (48 km) from the city in the Ivanpah Valley, called Ivanpah Valley Airport. Passenger traffic at McCarran had been rising steadily, and the county predicted that the airport would reach its capacity of 55 million passengers per year by 2008. The county began the process of acquiring federal land for the airport, and it started funding an EIS. However, the advent of an economic recession in 2007 and the resulting decline in passenger numbers called the Ivanpah Valley Airport project into question. In June 2010, the project was indefinitely suspended. In 2018, the county re-initiated planning for a new airport.

Terminal 3 and later developments (2012–present)
Terminal 3 opened on June 27, 2012. The project was announced in January 2001 as a way to accommodate rapid growth in passenger traffic, including international traffic. It came into question amid the 2008 recession and decreased tourism to Las Vegas, but the county decided to proceed with the project, in anticipation of eventual economic recovery and a rebound in passenger numbers. Terminal 3 cost $2.4 billion to build and is one of the largest public works projects in Nevada. It replaced Terminal 2, providing more international gates and a larger U.S. Customs and Border Protection facility. With its seven domestic gates, the terminal also eases congestion at Terminal 1.

In a $51 million project, eight domestic gates in the D Gates (D19-D26) nearest to Concourse E were converted to seven "swing" gates, capable of receiving both domestic and international flights. The gates were connected to the customs facility in Terminal 3 by an underground pedestrian passageway. Gates D21/D22 were converted into the only 3-jetway gate at the now-Reid; this was done to provide a proper accommodation area for the double-decker Airbus A380. This conversion resulted in the conversion of Gate D23 to D22A, and this "swing" gate project was completed in June 2017. In addition, a $30 million renovation of Terminal 1's ticketing and baggage claim areas was underway as of December 2016. Improvements include refurbished bathrooms, new ticket counters, and terrazzo flooring.

The airport acquired a route to South America in June 2018, when a LATAM Brasil aircraft touched down from São Paulo. Flights operated until September, and the carrier stated it would return in the winter.

The airport control tower was closed for several days in March 2020 after a controller tested positive for COVID-19. Airport operations continued using the common traffic advisory frequency, though many flights were delayed or cancelled due to reduced capacity.

Renaming to Harry Reid International Airport
From as early as 2012, there had been calls by elected officials to rename the airport, due to the past actions and comments of the late Nevada senator Pat McCarran that have been viewed as anti-semitic and racist. U.S. Senator Harry Reid of Nevada told the press in 2012 while he was Majority Leader that McCarran "was one of the most anti-Semitic... one of the most anti-black, one of the most prejudiced people who has ever served in the Senate," adding it was his opinion that McCarran's name should not be on anything.

After previous attempts failed to pass, there was renewed momentum to rename the airport after the murder of George Floyd and the protests in the U.S. that followed. On February 16, 2021, the Clark County Commission voted unanimously to rename the airport Harry Reid International Airport. Reid expressed his appreciation for the recognition after the vote.

Airport officials expected the renaming to cost $4.2 million, with no public money going towards the cost. The airport was officially renamed Harry Reid International Airport on December 14, 2021. Reid, who was terminally ill, did not attend the renaming ceremony in person. Two weeks after the airport was renamed, Reid died at 82 years of age. The Federal Aviation Administration  updated its official aeronautical charts in June 2021 to reflect the new name.

Facilities

Runways

Harry Reid International Airport has four runways:

All runways have been resurfaced with concrete, a more durable material than the previous asphalt. In April 2016, 8L/26R was the last runway to be resurfaced; it is the longest at Reid and serves a third of the airport's traffic. Parallel to it is runway 8R/26L, which opened in 1991. On the western side of the airport are runways 1L/19R and 1R/19L. 1L/19R was a 5000-foot runway for light aircraft before it was widened and lengthened in 1997. Between the two sets of parallel runways was runway 14/32, which has been decommissioned. Runways 8L/26R and 8R/26L were previously 7L/25R and 7R/25L; they were renumbered in August 2017 due to a shift in direction of the Earth's magnetic field.

Dry weather at Reid allows operations under visual flying rules 99% of the time. During most of the year (about 56% of the time) the airport uses Visual Configuration 1: runways 19R and 26L for arrivals and 19L and 26R for departures. Airfield capacity in Configuration 1 is constrained by bordering military airspace, high terrain to the west, and an uphill departure from 26R. Because of the heat, 26R is favored over 19L for departures. When the winds shift in the winter (about 13% of the year), the airfield adopts Visual Configuration 3, which uses 01L and 26L for arrivals and 01L and 01R for departures. Marginal flying conditions adopt the same Configuration 1/Configuration 3 split based on the prevailing winds. In instrument weather, arrivals are preferred on 26L, and departures take off from 19L and 26R.

Terminals
Harry Reid International Airport contains two terminals and 5 concourses with a total of 108 gates. Terminal 1 was completed in 1963, Terminal 2 was completed in 1986, and Terminal 3 was completed in 2012. Prior to the completion of Terminal 3, Terminal 2 handled international flights. After Terminal 3 was completed, Terminal 2 became redundant and it was demolished in 2016. International arrivals are handled in Terminal 3, and seven gates (D19-D26) in Concourse D are connected to the customs facility in Terminal 3.

Terminal 1 contains 94 gates across four concourses (A, B, C and D).
Terminal 3 contains 14 gates across one concourse (E).

The terminals are connected airside via the Harry Reid International Airport Automated People Movers. The tram has three separate tram lines:

Green line connects Terminal 1 with C Gates.
Blue line connects Terminal 1 with D Gates.
Red line connects Terminal 3 with D Gates.

Ground transportation

Road access to Harry Reid International Airport is provided by Paradise Road to the north and by the Harry Reid Airport Connector to the south, which connects to the Las Vegas Beltway.

Terminal 1 and Terminal 3 have their own parking garages. Each also has its own economy lot, which provides lower parking rates, and a separate lot for oversize vehicles. Complimentary shuttle transportation is provided between the terminals and the remote Terminal 1 economy and oversize vehicle lots. In March 2016, the airport opened a cellphone lot, which provides free parking to people waiting for passengers.

Courtesy shuttles transport passengers between the airport and the facility.

For transportation between Terminal 1 and Terminal 3, Harry Reid International Airport provides a free shuttle service, which leaves from Level 0 of both terminals.

RTC Transit provides bus transportation to and from various parts of the Las Vegas Valley. Route 108, Route 109, and the Centennial Express (CX) provide direct access to the airport. Buses depart from Level 0 of Terminal 1 and Level 2 of Terminal 3.

Extension of the Las Vegas Monorail, whose southern terminus is across the street from the airport's runway, to the airport terminal, has been proposed several times but has not yet come to fruition.

Other facilities
A small parking lot on the south side of the airport, on E. Sunset Road, between Las Vegas Blvd., and S. Eastern Ave, allows the public to watch aircraft take off, land, and listen to the aircraft radios.  This is the only "official" watching area.  There are several unofficial areas, mainly off the ends of the runways, however they are heavily patrolled by Las Vegas Metro Police and spectators are commonly asked to leave.

In 1968, slot machines were first installed at the airport. The Las Vegas and Reno airports are the only two airports in the United States with slot machines. Michael Gaughan Airport Slots Inc. is the operator. In 2022, the slot machines generated a cumulative $1 billion in revenue over the life of the concession, with average revenue collected in 2022 of $39.8 million, of which 86.5% goes to the airport.

Atlantic Aviation and Signature Flight Support are the two fixed-base operators (FBOs) at the airport, providing various services to private aircraft. Engine 13 of the Clark County Fire Department is located on the grounds of Harry Reid International Airport.

Maverick Helicopters and Papillon Grand Canyon Helicopters each operate their own terminal at Harry Reid Airport. The Papillon terminal was established in 1997. The companies provide helicopter tours over the Las Vegas Strip, Grand Canyon, and other tourist attractions.

Janet flights depart from a private terminal located on the west side of the airport. The airline, which is owned by the U.S. Air Force and operated by AECOM, transports employees and contractors to airports within the Nevada National Security Site.

The $29 million facility opened in October 2010, replacing a smaller facility that existed at the site of Terminal 3. The center consists of two buildings, one of which is leased by FedEx and the other by multiple other companies, including UPS and Southwest Airlines.

The main exhibits of the Howard W. Cannon Aviation Museum are located on Level 2 of Terminal 1, above baggage claim. There are additional exhibits throughout the airport and at other airports in the city. Display items chronicle the early history of aviation in Southern Nevada. The museum is named after former Nevada Senator Howard Cannon, who contributed to the development of aviation in the county. Its administrator is Mark Hall-Patton, who has appeared on the reality television show Pawn Stars.

Airlines and destinations

Passenger

{{Airport destination list | 3rdcoltitle = Refs | 3rdcolunsortable=yes

| Advanced Air | Merced | 

| Aeroméxico | Mexico City | 
 
| Air Canada | Calgary, Vancouver | 

| Air Canada Rouge | Montréal–Trudeau, Toronto–Pearson | 

| Alaska Airlines | Anchorage, Boise, Everett, Los Angeles, Portland (OR), San Francisco, Seattle/Tacoma | 

| Allegiant Air | Appleton, Asheville, Austin, Belleville/St. Louis, Bellingham, Billings, Bismarck, Boise, Bozeman, Cedar Rapids/Iowa City, Chicago/Rockford, Cincinnati, Des Moines, Destin/Fort Walton Beach, El Paso, Eugene, Fargo, Fayetteville/Bentonville, Flint, Fort Wayne, Fresno, Glacier Park/Kalispell, Grand Forks, Grand Island, Grand Junction, Grand Rapids, Great Falls, Idaho Falls, Indianapolis, Knoxville, Laredo, Lexington (begins June 15, 2023), McAllen, Medford, Memphis, Minot, Missoula, Moline/Quad Cities, Monterey, Oakland, Oklahoma City, Omaha, Orange County (CA), Orlando/Sanford, Peoria, Phoenix/Mesa, Provo, Rapid City, Reno/Tahoe, San Antonio, San Diego, Santa Maria (CA), Shreveport, Sioux Falls, South Bend, Spokane, Springfield/Branson, Stockton, Pasco (WA), Tulsa, Wichita| 

| American Airlines | Austin, Charlotte, Chicago–O'Hare, Dallas/Fort Worth, Los Angeles, Miami, Philadelphia, Phoenix–Sky Harbor, Washington–National | 

| American Eagle |Phoenix–Sky Harbor | 

| Avelo Airlines | Santa Rosa | 

| Breeze Airways | Akron/Canton, Fort Myers, Hartford, Huntsville, Jacksonville (FL), Norfolk, Provo, Richmond, San Bernardino, Syracuse | 

| British Airways | London–Heathrow Seasonal: London–Gatwick (resumes March 26, 2023) | 

| Canada Jetlines | Toronto–Pearson | 

| Condor | Seasonal: Frankfurt | 

| Copa Airlines | Panama City–Tocumen | 

| Delta Air Lines | Atlanta, Boston, Cincinnati, Detroit, Los Angeles, Minneapolis/St. Paul, New York–JFK, Raleigh/Durham, Salt Lake City, Seattle/Tacoma | 

| Edelweiss Air | Seasonal: Zürich | 

| Eurowings Discover | Frankfurt | 

| Flair Airlines | Edmonton, Toronto–Pearson, Vancouver  Seasonal: Abbotsford, Calgary (resumes October 29, 2023), Ottawa (begins October 13, 2023) | 

| Frontier Airlines | Atlanta, Austin, Baltimore (ends May 10, 2023), Buffalo, Charlotte, Chicago–Midway, Chicago–O'Hare, Cincinnati, Cleveland, Dallas/Fort Worth, Denver, Des Moines, Detroit, El Paso, Fort Lauderdale (ends May 10, 2023), Guadalajara, Hartford, Houston–Hobby (ends May 10, 2023), Houston–Intercontinental, Indianapolis, Kansas City, Little Rock, Memphis (ends May 8, 2023), Miami, Milwaukee, Minneapolis/St. Paul, Monterrey, Nashville, New Orleans (ends May 8, 2023), Oakland, Oklahoma City, Omaha, Ontario (CA), Orange County, Orlando, Philadelphia, Phoenix–Sky Harbor, Portland (OR), Puerto Vallarta, Raleigh/Durham, Reno/Tahoe, St. Louis, Salt Lake City, San Antonio, San Diego, San Francisco, San José del Cabo, Seattle/Tacoma, Tampa | 

| Hawaiian Airlines | Honolulu, Kahului | 
 
| JetBlue | Boston, Fort Lauderdale, Los Angeles, New York–JFK  Seasonal: Cancún | 

| JSX | Burbank, Dallas–Love, Denver–Rocky Mountain, Los Angeles, Oakland, Orange County, Phoenix–Sky Harbor, Reno/Tahoe, San Diego | 

| KLM | Amsterdam | 

| Korean Air | Seoul–Incheon | 

| Lynx Air | Calgary | 

| |Ontario (CA) (begins June 2, 2023)|<ref>

Cargo

Statistics

Top destinations

Airline market share

International Airlines

Annual traffic

Accidents and incidents
 On the evening of November 15, 1964, Bonanza Air Lines Flight 114, a Fairchild F-27 turboprop flying from Phoenix Sky Harbor International Airport to McCarran International Airport crashed into the top of a hill in desert country about  SSW of Las Vegas in poor weather conditions, all 26 passengers and three crew perished. The probable cause was the misreading of a faulty, outdated approach chart by the captain which resulted in a premature descent before impacting terrain.

Lap records 
The SCCA hosted a number of road racing events at the airport on a portion of the airfield between 1960 and 1962. The official race lap records at McCarran Field are listed as:

Notes

References

Bibliography

External links

 
 
 
 Howard W. Cannon Aviation Museum   Official site
 Jeppesen airport diagrams for 1955 and 1966

Harry Reid International Airport
1942 establishments in Nevada
Airports established in 1942
Airports in Clark County, Nevada
Buildings and structures in Paradise, Nevada
Transportation in the Las Vegas Valley
Airports in Nevada
Airports